Erik Nissen Viborg (5 April 1759 – 25 September 1822) was a Danish veterinarian and botanist.

Viborg studied veterinary science by P.C. Abildgaard at the Veterinary School in Copenhagen and soon became the professor’s assistant (in 1783).

From 1784 to 1787, Viborg travelled in Europe. After his return, he won a prize from the Royal Danish Academy of Sciences and Letters for his thesis about the ‘sand plants’ (mainly Marram grass) and their use as sand-binders in protection of agricultural lands from aeolian sand. He was then appointed teacher (with the title of professor) at the Veterinary School (1787–1790). In 1796, the king sent Viborg to Poland and Romania to purchase stallions for the Frederiksborg stud farm. When the chair of botany was installed in 1797 at the University of Copenhagen, Viborg became its first holder, surpassing Martin Vahl. This was probably achieved more through ties to the upper circles than through scientific merit. After the death of Abildgaard in 1801, Viborg became professor and rector of the Veterinary School –a position he held to his death. In 1816, he was elected a foreign member of the Royal Swedish Academy of Sciences.

The legume genus Wiborgia Thunb. was named for him.

References

External links 
 Entry on Erik Viborg i DBL, the Danish Biographical Encyclopedia''.

Danish veterinarians
19th-century Danish botanists
Academic staff of the University of Copenhagen
Members of the Royal Swedish Academy of Sciences
1759 births
1822 deaths
18th-century Danish botanists